The women's speed skating 10,000 metres points race competition of the roller skating events at the 2015 Pan American Games was held on July 13 at the St. John Paul II Catholic Secondary School in Toronto.

Schedule
All times are Central Standard Time (UTC-6).

Results
11 athletes from 11 countries competed.

References

Roller sports at the 2015 Pan American Games